The Clone Codes is a  2010 science fiction novel by American writers Patricia and Fredrick McKissack. It is about a girl, Leanna, who lives in 22nd century America where human clones and cyborgs are treated like second-class citizens, and what happens when she discovers that her parents are activists and that she is a clone.

Reception
Booklist, in its review of The Clone Codes, wrote "The McKissacks' slight story for younger readers packs a great deal of messaging, which will no doubt prove useful in classroom discussions of issues and themes but sometimes comes at the expense of the story. The science-fiction backdrop serves as a framework for issues of identity and societal prejudice but is not predominant in the reading experience." School Library Journal'''s review was more critical, calling it "A clunky, didactic science-fiction allegory." and wrote "Some aspects of the plot are predictable and poorly drawn .. too many references to the distant past .. prevent the futuristic setting from coming to life." Nevertheless, it did conclude "Still, the fast pace, short chapters, and slim page count will make this volume attractive to reluctant readers, and the obvious curriculum tie-ins will appeal to teachers."The Clone Codes has also been reviewed by The Horn Book Magazine, Library Media Connection, Voice of Youth Advocates, Kirkus Reviews, Publishers Weekly, The Bulletin of the Center for Children's Books, and Multicultural Review''.

It was an Iowa Children's Choice Award nominee.

References

External links

Internet Speculative Fiction Database entry of The Clone Codes
Library holdings of The Clone Codes

2010 children's books
2010 American novels
2010 science fiction novels
American children's novels
American science fiction novels
Children's science fiction novels
Novels set in the 22nd century
Novels about slavery
Novels about virtual reality
Books by Patricia McKissack
Scholastic Corporation books